Psycho Thug is the fifth album released by rapper, Ganxsta NIP. It was released on May 18, 1999 through independent label, Happy Alone Records and was produced by 151 Productions, Bishop, Dope E, J Slash, J.B. and Scagnetti "Al" Capone. This marked Ganxsta NIP's first album to not be released through Rap-a-Lot Records.

Track listing
"Intro"- :50  
"Keep Striving"- 4:09  
"We Finna Come Up"- 3:38 (Feat. Dope-E) 
"Lil Mama's"- 3:44  (Feat. 1-Shot, Bishop) 
"Snitch Niggas"- 3:48  (Feat. Big Ron, Bishop) 
"Keep It Real"- 4:02  (Feat. Point Blank)
"Pimp Niggas"- 3:58  
"Psycho Thug!"- 4:03  
"Candy Man Chant"- 4:11  
"Do You Like Scary Movies"- 3:06  
"Graveyard"- 3:03  
"Insect Warground"- 3:16  
"Mood Swings"- 4:56  
"Psych' Ward"- 4:13 (Feat. 1-Shot, Big Ron, Bishop)

Personnel
Executive Producer - Robert Guillerman

Producer - 151 Productions* (tracks: 7, 8, 12), J.B. (tracks: 2, 6, 9, 10)

Samples

Keep It Real
 "Keep It Real" By MC Ren

1999 albums
Ganksta N-I-P albums
Horrorcore albums